NWA Wildside was an American independent professional wrestling promotion based in Cornelia, Georgia, with an office in Atlanta, Georgia, operating between September 1999 and April 2005. It was originally formed when National Championship Wrestling merged with NWA Georgia. While in operation, NWA Wildside was one of the main affiliates of the National Wrestling Alliance, a group that dates back to 1948. It also served as a developmental territory for World Championship Wrestling.

History
NWA Wildside originated as National Championship Wrestling. In November 1998, the first show was held at the (then) NCW Arena in Cornelia, Georgia. Over the next few months, NCW began to gain notoriety in the Georgia independent scene until Bill Behrens approached Steve Martin with an offer to syndicate NCW television programming and merge his company NWA Georgia to create one NWA affiliate. This offer was accepted, and in September 1999, the first NWA Wildside weekly show aired out of Atlanta. Over the next six years, multiple notable wrestling personalities appeared on NWA Wildside television. Wrestlers such as Onyx, David Young and Rick Michaels appeared on World Wrestling Federation tapings. With the establishment of Total Nonstop Action Wrestling, various NWA Wildside stars such as Styles, Abyss (Prince Justice), Young, Onyx, Slim J, Joey Corman, Hotstuff Hernandez, Jason Cross, Jimmy Rave, Altar Boy Luke, Matt Sydal, Delirious, and Tony Mamaluke appeared for the company.

WCW Developmental Territory
World Championship Wrestling (WCW) hired NWA Wildside to serve as its development territory and sent their Power Plant wrestlers like Shannon Moore, Jamie Noble, Sean O'Haire, Mark Jindrak and Elix Skipper to compete in the company. WCW hired several NWA Wildside talent for their shows including A.J. Styles and Frank "Air" Paris

Television 

Wildside's weekly one-hour TV show aired nationally through syndication and was available to as much as 40% of the United States at its peak. By 2002, NWA Wildside was the fourth most-watched wrestling program in the United States. 

In late 2004, Wildside was broadcast by The Wrestling Channel in the United Kingdom giving them a transatlantic audience.

Demise
In April 2005, NWA Wildside closed down, after producing 300 consecutive weeks of television, as a result of owner Behrens accepting a job with World Wrestling Entertainment. NWA Wildside was replaced by NWA Anarchy, a promotion operating in the same arena using similar talent.

Legacy 
NWA Wildside had a notable influence on the early 2000s independent wrestling scene. Multiple future international superstars passed through Wildside in its six-year existence. Wildside's syndication television deal largely kept NWA wrestling on the map in the first half of the decade as one of the NWA's main affiliates. 

On September 9, 2017, NWA Wildside held a reunion show at the former NCW Arena, now the Landmark Arena in Cornelia, Georgia featuring over 50 alumni from the Wildside years including Bad Attitude, New Jack, Tank, Iceberg and A.J. Styles.

Championships
Champions listed are the final champions in Wildside.
 NWA Wildside Heavyweight Championship — Onyx
 NWA Wildside Junior Heavyweight Championship — Slim J. 
 NWA Wildside Tag Team Championship — Iceberg and Tank
 NWA Wildside Television Championship — Brandon P
 NWA Wildside United States Heavyweight Championship — Rainman (unified with NWA Wildside Heavyweight Championship)
 NWA Wildside Hardcore Championship — The Jailhouse Rocker

Alumni

 Altar Boy Luke
 C. W. Anderson
 Brian Black
 Bull Buchanan
 Brian Christopher
 Jason Cross
Eddie Golden
 Delirious
 Ray Gordy
 Jimmy Rave 
 Chris Hamrick
 Chris Harris
 Hotstuff Hernandez
 Ron Killings
 New Jack
 Prince Justice
 Alexis Laree
 Lodi
 Tony Mamaluke
 Joey Matthews
 Rick Michaels
 Shannon Moore
 Sean O'Haire
 Onyx
 Air Paris
 Bob Sapp
 Ric Savage
 Sinister Minister
 Tony Stradlin

 A.J. Styles
 Matt Sydal
 David Young

See also
List of National Wrestling Alliance territories
List of independent wrestling promotions in the United States

References

External links
NWAWildside.com

Organizations established in 1997
Organizations disestablished in 2005
Independent professional wrestling promotions based in Georgia (U.S. state)
National Wrestling Alliance members